, also credited as , was a Japanese cinematographer. He was especially known for his work on a number of films by Japanese director Kenji Mizoguchi, including Osaka Elegy and Sisters of the Gion, which were both placed among the top three films of 1936 by the Japanese magazine Kinema Junpo.

References

External links

Japanese cinematographers
1902 births
1968 deaths